Prosoplus convexicollis is a species of beetle in the family Cerambycidae. It was described by Stephan von Breuning in 1951. It is known from Papua New Guinea.

References

Prosoplus
Beetles described in 1951